The 1981 National League was contested as the second division/tier of Speedway in the United Kingdom.

Summary
The league started with 20 teams with Nottingham Outlaws dropping out and Wolverhampton Wolves joining up, having moved down from the British League.

Berwick Bandits were forced to quit after 26 league meetings, their record being expunged. Middlesbrough Tigers comfortably won their first ever title.

Exeter Falcons rider Tony Sanford died following an accident at the County Ground Stadium on 7 September. He was racing in a match against Milton Keynes when he hit a barrier near the final bend. A memorial trophy was held in subsequent years in his memory.

Final table

National League Knockout Cup
The 1981 National League Knockout Cup was the 14th edition of the Knockout Cup for tier two teams. Edinburgh Monarchs were the winners of the competition.

First round

Second round

Quarter-finals

Semi-finals

Final
First leg

Second leg

Edinburgh were declared Knockout Cup Champions, winning on aggregate 101–89.

Leading final averages

Riders & final averages
Berwick (withdrew from league)

Wayne Brown 9.24
Steve McDermott 8.40
Rob Grant Sr 6.95 
Mike Caroline 5.94
Brian Collins 5.38
Brett Saunders 5.05 
Roger Wright 4.92
Graham Jones 4.61
Jim Beaton 4.00
Ian Anderson 1.26

Boston

David Gagen 8.84 
Steve Lomas 8.84
Steve Regeling 8.47
Rob Hollingworth 8.45
Dennis Mallett 6.35
Mike Spinks 5.95
Michael Holding 5.23
Keven Dye 4.31
Chris Cole 3.45

Canterbury

Mike Ferreira 10.87 
Denzil Kent 7.75
Barney Kennett 6.81
Mark Martin 4.69
Darryl Simpson 4.43
Kevin Brice 4.21
Brendan Shiletto 4.07
Jamie Luckhurst 3.78
Rob Dolman 3.30
Graham Knowler 2.67

Crayford

Barry Thomas 9.02
Alan Sage 7.88
Laurie Etheridge 6.90
Mike Pither 5.72
Trevor Barnwell 5.70
Mike Spinks 4.83
Paul Hollingsbee 4.47
Keith Pritchard 4.15
Paul Bosley 2.24

Edinburgh

Neil Collins 9.68
Dave Trownson 8.57
George Hunter 8.45
Chris Turner 7.49
Ivan Blacka 7.07
Benny Rourke 5.85
Roger Lambert 5.27
Guy Robson 2.77
Ian Westwell 2.27

Ellesmere Port

Billy Burton 8.63
Steve Finch 8.14
Peter Carr 7.49
John Jackson 7.34 
Rob Ashton 6.51
Phil Alderman 5.98
Eric Monaghan 5.98
Paul Embley 4.81
Paul Price 3.11
Andrew Reeves 1.68

Exeter

Rob Maxfield 9.07
Bob Coles 8.24
Martin Hewlett 8.10 
John Barker 7.85
Les Sawyer 7.68
Andy Campbell 6.53
Keith Wright 6.00
John Williams 5.99
Keith Millard 4.30
Tony Sanford 3.20

Glasgow

Steve Lawson 10.55 
Charlie McKinna 8.04
Kenny McKinna 7.57 
Nigel Close 7.08
Harry MacLean 6.02
Colin Caffrey 5.80
Andy Reid 5.52
Ray Palmer 4.44
Alan Mason 2.74

Middlesbrough

Mark Courtney 10.44 
Steve Wilcock 9.95
Martin Dixon 8.28 
Brian Havelock 7.20
Mike Spink 7.18 
Geoff Pusey 6.71 
Bernie Collier 5.05
Peter Tarrant 3.60
Alan Armstrong 3.54

Mildenhall

Robert Henry 8.59 
Ray Bales 8.35 
Mick Bates 8.25
Ian Gledhill 7.89
Richard Knight 7.24
Carl Baldwin 4.48
Andy Warne 3.78
Mark Bilner 3.73
Carl Blackbird 2.77

Milton Keynes

Bob Humphreys 9.14 
Graham Plant 6.38
Andy Hibbs 6.00
Mick Blaynee 4.77
Barry Allaway 4.41
Mark Baldwin 4.36
Steve Payne 4.30
Nigel Davis 4.20
Brett Alderton 4.15

Newcastle

David Bargh 9.04 
Rod Hunter 8.68
Robbie Blackadder 8.40
Alan Emerson 8.07
Keith Bloxsome 6.87
Glenn MacDonald 5.54
Kym Mauger 2.92

Oxford

Dave Perks 10.13 
Derek Harrison 9.40
Colin Ackroyd 8.12 
Paul Evitts 5.31
Arthur Price 4.51
John Grahame 4.14
Mick Handley .4.04
Mick Fletcher 3.94
Alan MacLean 1.44

Peterborough

Richard Greer 8.20
Andy Hines 8.04
Dave Allen 7.69 
Mick Hines 7.58 
Andy Fisher 6.08
Nigel Couzens 5.97
Andy Buck 5.32
Ian Barney 4.91

Rye House

Bobby Garrad 8.85
Kelvin Mullarkey 8.27 
Steve Naylor 7.67 
Kevin Bowen 5.05
Peter Johns 4.71
Peter Tarrant 4.62
Marvyn Cox 4.57 
Garry Monk 4.51
Barry King 4.20
Tony Garard 2.18

Scunthorpe

Kevin Teager 7.56
Nicky Allott 7.51
Mark DeKok 5.71
Tony Featherstone 5.33
Rob Woffinden 5.19
Tony Childs 3.62
Graeme Beardsley 3.45
Julian Parr 2.99
Phil Kynman 2.73

Stoke

Pete Smith 8.28
Mike Sampson 7.97 
Arthur Browning 6.68
Rob Lightfoot 6.55
Mark Collins 6.29
Rod North 6.11
Steve Sant 6.06
Ian Robertson 3.87

Weymouth

Les Rumsey 10.19
Martin Yeates 10.12
Simon Wigg 10.07
Brian Woodward 7.11
Malcolm Shakespeare 7.02
Terry Tulloch 5.91
Steve Crockett 5.68
Steve Schofield 5.64
Bob Coles 5.22

Wolverhampton

Bruce Cribb 9.99
Les Rumsey 8.77
Neil Evitts 7.80
Billy Burton 6.74
Tony Boyle 5.95
Paul Stead 5.51
Mike Wilding 4.11
Rob Carter 3.55
John Hough 3.49
Steve Crockett 1.41

Workington

Terry Kelly 6.97
Wayne Jackson 6.22
Mark Dickinson 5.67
Guy Wilson 4.47
Des Wilson 4.42
Kevin Clapham 3.67
David Blackburn 3.51
John Frankland 2.69
Michael Irving 0.89

See also
List of United Kingdom Speedway League Champions
Knockout Cup (speedway)

References

Speedway British League Division Two / National League